Hugh Vincent McGeehan (June 8, 1894 – August 17, 1948) was an American football player and coach.  He served as the head football coach at Villanova College—now known as Villanova University—for one season, in 1923, compiling a record of 0–7–1. McGeehan's brother, Charles McGeehan was Villanova's head football coach in 1912.

Head coaching record

References

1894 births
1948 deaths
Villanova Wildcats football coaches
Villanova Wildcats football players
People from Hazleton, Pennsylvania
Coaches of American football from Pennsylvania
Players of American football from Pennsylvania